Dain Elmer Clay (July 10, 1919 – August 28, 1994) was a Major League Baseball outfielder. He played for the Cincinnati Reds of the National League. Clay played collegiately at Kent State University in 1943. In , Clay led the National League in at-bats with 656, and was sixth in games played, with 153. In 433 games, Clay was a  career hitter (397-for-1540) with 3 home runs and 98 runs batted in.

External links

Cincinnati Reds players
San Diego Padres (minor league) players
Major League Baseball outfielders
Baseball players from Ohio
1919 births
1994 deaths
Kent State Golden Flashes baseball players
Sportspeople from Chula Vista, California
People from Hicksville, Ohio
Decatur Commodores players
Houston Buffaloes players
Kansas City Blues (baseball) players
New Orleans Pelicans (baseball) players
Portland Beavers players
Portsmouth Red Birds players
Rochester Red Wings players
Victoria Tyees players
Wenatchee Chiefs players